The Raiders is a 1963 American Western film directed by Herschel Daugherty and written by Gene L. Coon. The film stars Brian Keith, Robert Culp, Judi Meredith, Jim McMullan, Alfred Ryder and Simon Oakland. The film was released in December 1963, by Universal Pictures.

Plot
Shortly after the American Civil War, poverty-stricken Texas cattle-men are confronted by a gun-slinger who has been hired by the US government and a buffalo hunter after they use desperate measures to try and  get their grievances addressed by the railroad company.

Cast 
Robert Culp as James Butler 'Wild Bill' Hickok
Brian Keith as John G. McElroy/Narrator
Judi Meredith as Martha 'Calamity Jane' Canary
Jim McMullan as William F. 'Buffalo Bill' Cody
Alfred Ryder as Capt. Benton
Simon Oakland as Sgt. Austin Tremaine
Ben Cooper as Tom King
Trevor Bardette as 'Uncle Otto' Strassner
Harry Carey, Jr. as Jellicoe
Richard H. Cutting as Jack Goodnight 
Addison Richards as Huntington Lawford
Cliff Osmond as Private Jean Duchamps
Paul Birch as Paul King
Richard Deacon as Commissioner Mailer
Michael Burns as Jimmy McElroy

References

External links
 

1963 films
1960s English-language films
American Western (genre) films
1963 Western (genre) films
Universal Pictures films
Cultural depictions of Wild Bill Hickok
Cultural depictions of Buffalo Bill
Cultural depictions of Calamity Jane
Films directed by Herschel Daugherty
1960s American films